The South Portland Public Library is the public library serving South Portland, Maine.

In 1965, ground was broken for the $300,579 library building. The doors were opened for service to the public in 1966.

The Memorial Branch Library was opened on Wescott Road in 1976.

References

External links 

Library buildings completed in 1966
Public libraries in Maine
Libraries established in 1966
Buildings and structures in South Portland, Maine
Education in South Portland, Maine
Libraries in Cumberland County, Maine
1966 establishments in Maine